They Call Me Carpenter: A Tale of the Second Coming is a novel written by Upton Sinclair in 1922 that exposed the new and upcoming culture of 1920s Southern California, namely Hollywood.  Sinclair does this by using Jesus, or Carpenter as Sinclair calls him, as a literary figure.

Plot
The story takes place in the fictional locale Western City.  It begins with a man named Billy who is attacked by a mob outside a theater after watching a German film. Billy then stumbles into a church and is visited by Carpenter, that is Jesus, who walks out of a stained glass window.  Carpenter is shocked and appalled by upper-class culture. The story then roughly follows the biblical account of the Ministry of Jesus.  In the end, Carpenter decides to escape the corroded culture by jumping back into the stained glass window whence he came.

External links
 Upton Sinclair They Call Me Carpenter: A Tale of the Second Coming 1922 (Gutenberg)
 

1922 American novels
Novelistic portrayals of Jesus
Novels by Upton Sinclair
Novels set in California
Self-published books